Vittorio Crotta (born 12 April 1946) is an Italian retired professional tennis player who won a bronze medal at the 1967 Mediterranean Games and represented Italy in the Davis Cup in 1967 and 1969.

References

External links

Italian male tennis players
Living people
1946 births
Mediterranean Games bronze medalists for Italy
Competitors at the 1975 Mediterranean Games
Mediterranean Games medalists in tennis
20th-century Italian people
21st-century Italian people